Joseph Harper (17 March 1914 – 24 June 1978) was a Labour Party politician in Great Britain.

He was elected as the Member of Parliament MP for Pontefract at a by-election in 1962.  He was MP for the constituency and then the reformed Pontefract and Castleford constituency until he died in office at the age of 64. Playwright James Graham has attributed Harper's death to his  decision to "[delay] emergency surgery in his determination to never miss a vote".

At the by-election held after Harper's death, the seat was held for Labour by Geoffrey Lofthouse.

Harper was from a working-class background working at Ackton Hall Colliery, Featherstone. He lived at 11 Bedford Close, Featherstone with his wife Gwen and youngest daughter Pat. He had a further daughter, Wendy, who also resided on Bedford Close, and two sons Glyn and Graham.

References

External links 
 

1914 births
1978 deaths
Labour Party (UK) MPs for English constituencies
National Union of Mineworkers-sponsored MPs
UK MPs 1959–1964
UK MPs 1964–1966
UK MPs 1966–1970
UK MPs 1970–1974
UK MPs 1974
UK MPs 1974–1979
Ministers in the Wilson governments, 1964–1970